CMA CGM Magellan is an  built for CMA CGM. The ship is named after Portuguese explorer Ferdinand Magellan.

References

Container ships
Magellan
Magellan
Ships built by Daewoo Shipbuilding & Marine Engineering
2010 ships